Joseph Bernard Vidal (15 November 1859 – 18 December 1924) was a French composer, born in Toulouse. Among his works are two operas Le Mariage d'Yvette (1896) and Le Chevalier de Fontenoy.  He died in Paris.

References

1859 births
1924 deaths
French classical composers
French male classical composers
French opera composers
Male opera composers